Francisco Armero y Fernández de Peñaranda (3 May 1804, in Fuentes de Andalucía – 1 July 1866, in Seville), Marquess of Nervión and Grandee of Spain was a Spanish Captain general of the Navy and politician.

Life 

He entered the Navy aged 16 and fought in the Battle of Trocadero (1823), Peruvian War of Independence (1824) and First Carlist War (1834–1840).

In 1840, he became for the first time Minister of the Navy, Commerce and Colonies under Prime Ministers Antonio González González, Valentín Ferraz y Barrau and Modesto Cortázar until 11 September 1840. Four years later, he became again Minister of the Navy, Commerce and Colonies in the Ramón María Narváez cabinet between 3 May 1844 and 12 February 1846, and again between 5 April 1846 and 28 January 1847 in the Francesco Xavier de Isturiz cabinet. He also held the post of Minister of War for a few days in April 1846.
He became for a fourth time Minister of the Navy between 2 June 1851 and 3 May 1852 under Juan Bravo Murillo.

Finally, he became Prime Minister himself on 15 October 1857. His cabinet held out until 14 January 1858, in which he also held the posts of Minister of the Interior and Minister of War.

On 22 February 1862 he received the title of Marqués de Nervión, and on 13 February 13, 1856 Captain general of the Navy.  But before that, he had served a fifth term as Minister of the Navy between 16 September 1864 and 21 Juny 1865 under Ramón María Narváez.

Sources 

 Biography (Spanish)
 "Don Francisco Armero", in: El Museo Universal, S. 251–252 (PDF; 792 kB)
 Cabinets under Isabella II. (1833–1843 - Les Regències)
 Cabinets under Isabella II. (1843–1856 - Década Moderada)
 Cabinets under Isabella II. (1856–1868 - La Unión Liberal)

Prime Ministers of Spain
1804 births
1866 deaths
Moderate Party (Spain) politicians
19th-century Spanish politicians
Captain generals of the Navy
Spanish naval officers